Durant may refer to:

People
 Durant (surname)

Fictional characters
 Durant (Pokémon), a species in Pokémon Black and White
 John Durant (General Hospital), a character on the soap opera General Hospital

Places 
 Durant, Florida, USA
 Durant, Iowa, USA
 Durant, Mississippi, USA
 Durant, Polk County, Nebraska, USA
 Durant, Oklahoma, USA

Fictional places
 Durant, Absaroka County, Wyoming, USA; fictional setting of the Longmire television series and novels by author Craig Johnson
 Durant, Nebraska, USA; fictional setting for the eponymous episode of the TV show Hell on Wheels

Education
 Durant Public School District, Durant, Mississippi, USA
 Durant Independent School District, Durant, Oklahoma, USA
 Durant (Iowa) Community School District, Cedar County, Iowa, USA
Durant High School (Plant City, Florida) in Plant City, Florida
Durant High School (Iowa) in Durant, Iowa
Durant High School (Mississippi) in Durant, Mississippi
Durant High School (Oklahoma) in Durant, Oklahoma

Transportation
 Durant Motors, a car manufacturer
 Durant (automobile), a marque of car produced by Durant 
 Durant Touring Car, a car produced by Durant
 , the Empire-ship Durant
 Durant Regional Airport–Eaker Field, Durant, Oklahoma, USA

Facilities and structures
 The Durant, an apartment building and former hotel in Flint, Michigan, USA
 Hotel Durant, a boutique hotel in Berkeley, California, USA
 Capt. Edward Durant House (Durant House), a historic house in Newton Centre, Massachusetts, USA
 Durant House (St. Charles, Illinois), a historic U.S. house
 Durant Hall, an NRHP-registered building in California, USA; see National Register of Historic Places listings in Alameda County, California

Other uses
Durant (cloth), a woven textile

See also 

 
 
 
 Durand (disambiguation)
 Durant House (disambiguation)
 Durant High School (disambiguation)
 Durant School District (disambiguation)
 Durante, given name and surname
 Durants School, Enfield, London, England, UK
 Durants Neck, North Carolina, USA
 Durrant, surname